Paula Bauersmith (July 26, 1909 – August 6, 1987) was an American actress.

Biography
Bauersmith was born in Oakmont, Pennsylvania to William Robinson Bauersmith and Susan (née Paul). She was educated in Waterbury, Connecticut, and attended the Carnegie Institute of Technology where she trained for the stage. She married Barnett M. Warren; he died in 1953. The couple had two children. 

She died of cancer at New York's Saint Vincent's Catholic Medical Center on August 6, 1987. Her daughter Jennifer Warren became an actress, and her son Paul Warren became the dean of Boston University School of Education. Paula Bauersmith was also a regular contributor to the crossword puzzles in New York Times.

Career
Bauersmith first appeared on the stage in 1929 while attending the Carnegie Institute of Technology. She made her New York City theatre debut in October 1931 playing Carmen Bracegirdle in the original Broadway theatre production of Lean Harvest at what was then referred to as the Forrest Theatre.

During her theatrical career, which spanned more than three decades, she appeared in several other original Broadway productions, such as Three-Cornered Moon in 1933, Bury the Dead (1936), Sail Away (1961), and Breakfast at Tiffany's (1966). She also appeared on various theatrical television programs, such as The United States Steel Hour (1954), Producers' Showcase (1955) and a television production of The Crucible (1967).

References

External links

1909 births
1987 deaths
People from Oakmont, Pennsylvania
American musical theatre actresses
American television actresses
Crossword compilers
20th-century American actresses
20th-century American singers
20th-century American women singers
Carnegie Mellon University College of Fine Arts alumni
Deaths from cancer in New York (state)